Pileanthus aurantiacus is a plant species of the family Myrtaceae endemic to Western Australia.

It blooms in October producing orange flowers.

It is found on flats, sand plains and dune slopes in the Mid West region of Western Australia near Northampton where it grows in sandy soils over limestone.

References

aurantiacus
Plants described in 2002
Taxa named by Gregory John Keighery
Endemic flora of Western Australia